Stadio Giuseppe Meazza, commonly known as San Siro, is a football stadium in the San Siro district of Milan, Italy, which is the home of A.C. Milan and Inter Milan. It has a seating capacity of 80,018, making it one of the largest stadiums in Europe, and the largest in Italy.

On 3 March 1980, the stadium was named in honour of Giuseppe Meazza, the two-time World Cup winner (1934, 1938) who played for Inter and briefly for Milan in the 1920s, 1930s, and 1940s and served two stints as Inter's manager.

San Siro is a UEFA category four stadium. It hosted three games at the 1934 FIFA World Cup, six games at the 1990 FIFA World Cup, three games at the UEFA Euro 1980, and four European Cup finals, in 1965, 1970, 2001 and 2016. The stadium will also host the opening ceremony of the 2026 Winter Olympics of Milan and Cortina d'Ampezzo.

History

Construction of the stadium commenced in 1925 in the district of Milan named San Siro, with the new stadium originally named Nuovo Stadio Calcistico San Siro (San Siro New Football Stadium). The idea to build a stadium in the same district as the horse racing track belonged to the president of A.C. Milan at the time, Piero Pirelli. The architects designed a private stadium only for football, without athletics tracks which characterized Italian stadiums built with public funds. The inauguration was on 19 September 1926, when 35,000 spectators saw Inter defeat Milan 6–3. Originally, the ground was home and property of A.C. Milan. Finally, in 1947, Inter, who used to play in the Arena Civica downtown, became tenants and the two have shared the ground ever since.

From 1948 to 1955, engineers Armando Ronca and Ferruccio Calzolari developed the project for the second extension of the stadium, which was meant to increase the capacity from 50,000 to 150,000 visitors. Calzolari and Ronca proposed three additional, vertically arranged, rings of spectator rows. Nineteen spiralling ramps – each 200 metres long – gave access to the upper tiers. During construction, the realisation of the highest of the three rings was abandoned and the number of visitors limited to 100,000. Then for security reasons, the capacity was reduced to 60,000 seats and 25,000 standing.

On 2 March 1980 the stadium was named for Giuseppe Meazza (1910–1979), one of the most famous Milanese footballers. For a time, Inter fans called the stadium Stadio Meazza due to Meazza's stronger connections with Inter (14 years as a player, three stints as manager). However, in recent years both Inter and Milan fans have called the stadium simply San Siro.

The last major renovation for San Siro, which cost $60 million, was that of 1987–1990, for the 1990 FIFA World Cup. It was decided to modernize the stadium by increasing its capacity to 85,000 spectators and building a cover. The Municipality of Milan entrusted the work to the architects Giancarlo Ragazzi and Enrico Hoffer and to the engineer Leo Finzi. To increase capacity, a third ring was built (only in the two curves and in the west grandstand) which rests on eleven support towers surrounded by helical ramps that allow access to the public. Four of these eleven concrete towers were located at the corners to support a new roof, which has distinctive protruding red girders.

In 1996 a museum was opened inside the stadium charting A.C. Milan and Internazionale's history, with historical shirts, cups and trophies, shoes, art objects and souvenirs of all kinds on display to visitors.

Two Milan derby Champions League knockout ties have taken place at San Siro, in 2003 and 2005, with A.C. Milan winning both ties. The reaction of Inter's fans to impending defeat in the 2005 match (throwing flares and other objects at Milan players and forcing the match to be abandoned) earned the club a large fine and a four-game ban on spectators attending European fixtures there the following season.

Apart from being used by Milan and Inter, the Italian national team occasionally plays games there. It has also been used for the European Cup finals of 1965 (won by Inter), 1970 (won by Feyenoord), and the UEFA Champions League finals of 2001 (won by FC Bayern Munich) and 2016 (won by Real Madrid).

The stadium was also used for the home leg of three UEFA Cup finals in which Inter was competing (1991, 1994, 1997) when these were played over two legs. It was also used by Juventus for their 'home' leg in 1995 as they decided against playing their biggest matches at their own Stadio delle Alpi at the time. On each occasion, apart from 1991, the second leg was played at San Siro and the winners lifted the trophy there. However, the stadium has not yet been selected as the host stadium since the competition changed to a single-match final format in 1997–98.

San Siro has never hosted a final of the UEFA Cup Winners' Cup, but was the host stadium for the 1951 Latin Cup, a four-team event won by A.C. Milan. The city was also the venue for the 1956 edition of the Latin Cup (also won by Milan), but those matches were played at Arena Civica.

Amid the COVID-19 pandemic in Italy, on 25 March, the Associated Press dubbed the UEFA Champions League match between Bergamo club Atalanta B.C. and Spanish club Valencia at San Siro on 19 February as "Game Zero". The match was the first time Atalanta has progressed to a Champions League round of 16 match, and had an attendance of over 40,000 people—about one third of Bergamo's population. By 24 March, almost 7,000 people in the province of Bergamo had tested positive for COVID-19, and more than 1,000 people had died from the virus—making Bergamo the most hard-hit province in all of Italy during the pandemic.

Potential replacement
On 24 June 2019, A.C. Milan and Internazionale announced their intention to build a new stadium to replace San Siro. The new 60,000 capacity stadium, which would be constructed next to San Siro, is anticipated to cost US$800 million and would be ready for the 2022–23 season. The design of the new stadium is said to be based upon the Mercedes-Benz Stadium in Atlanta, Georgia, United States.

Giuseppe Sala, the current Mayor of Milan, and the comune of Milan asked for time and stressed that San Siro would be kept until at least the 2026 Winter Olympics and Winter Paralympics to be held in Milan and Cortina d'Ampezzo. The proposed project was also met with some skepticism and opposition by several fans of both teams.

On 26 September 2019, A.C. Milan and Internazionale released two potential designs for the new stadium next to the original ground, tentatively named the Nuovo Stadio Milano, designed by Populous and MANICA, respectively. On 22 May 2020, Italy's heritage authority raised no objections to demolishing San Siro. On 21 December 2021 the Populous project was chosen.

International football matches

Italy national team

1934 FIFA World Cup
The stadium was one of the biggest venues of the 1934 FIFA World Cup and held three matches.

UEFA Euro 1980
The stadium was one of the four selected to host the matches during the UEFA Euro 1980.

1990 FIFA World Cup
The stadium was one of the venues of the 1990 FIFA World Cup and held six matches.

2021 UEFA Nations League Finals
The stadium was one of two selected to host the 2021 UEFA Nations League Finals matches.

Other sports

2026 Winter Olympics 
Opening ceremony of the 2026 Winter Olympics (Milano Cortina) will be held at San Siro on 6 February 2026.

Boxing 
San Siro was the venue for the boxing match between Duilio Loi vs. Carlos Ortiz for the Junior Welterweight title in 1960.

Rugby union 
The first and only top level rugby union match to be played at San Siro was a test match between Italy and New Zealand in November 2009. A crowd of 80,000 watched the event, a record for Italian rugby.

Concerts

Besides football, San Siro can be configured to hold many other events, particularly major concerts.

Transport connections 
The stadium is located in the northwestern part of Milan and can be reached by underground via the dedicated San Siro subway station (at the end of line M5), located just in front of the stadium, or by tram, with line 16 ending right in front of the building. The Lotto subway station (line M1 and line M5) is about 15 minutes walk away from San Siro.

Stations nearby:

References

External links 

  
 AC Milan website
 FC Internazionale Milano website
 San Siro on Facebook
 San Siro on Facebook (AC Milan)
 San Siro on Facebook (FC Internazionale Milano)
 San Siro at Google Maps
 Stadium Guide Article

1925 establishments in Italy
1934 FIFA World Cup stadiums
1990 FIFA World Cup stadiums
A.C. Milan
Football venues in Italy
Inter Milan
Italian fascist architecture
Rugby union stadiums in Italy
Museums in Milan
Olympic stadiums
Serie A venues
Sports venues completed in 1926
Sports venues in Milan
Stadiums that have hosted a FIFA World Cup opening match
UEFA Euro 1980 stadiums
Venues of the 2026 Winter Olympics